Ancova is a genus of snout moths. It was described by Ragonot, in 1893, and contains the species A. meridionalis. It is found in India.

References

Phycitinae
Moth genera